Gerlaw is an unincorporated community in Warren County, Illinois, United States.

Gerlaw had a post office, which closed on August 28, 2010.

References

Unincorporated communities in Warren County, Illinois
Unincorporated communities in Illinois